Marc Spindler (born November 28, 1969) is a former American football player who was a defensive tackle and defensive end who played nine seasons in the National Football League. Since retiring from football, Spindler has worked for both WDFN and WXYT, two Detroit area sports talk radio stations.

In 1986, Spindler was named USA Today High School Defensive Player of the Year.

1969 births
American football defensive tackles
American football defensive ends
Players of American football from Pennsylvania
Living people
Detroit Lions players
New York Jets players
Pittsburgh Panthers football players